Doctor James C. "Jim" Crow (1789–1856) has sometimes been loosely credited as the perfecter of the sour mash process used in creating bourbon whiskey. There are no historical records pinpointing him as the creator.

Crow, born in Inverness, Scotland, was a chemist-physician, graduated in medicine from Edinburgh University in 1822. He moved from Philadelphia to Kentucky in 1823 and began working for a distiller, utilizing his scientific and medical training.

According to The Kentucky Encyclopedia, Crow began experimenting in 1835 at his Glenn's Creek Distillery in Woodford County, Kentucky, with a saccharometer to measure sugar content. This litmus paper test to determine the mash acidity resulted in Crow's decision to age his "Old Crow" whiskey before selling it.

Crow moved to the town of Millville, and for the next 20 years was in charge of the Old Oscar Pepper Distillery, now known as Woodford Reserve. Later he worked for the Johnson Distillery. That distillery eventually became Old Taylor. He worked there until his death in 1856.

References 

1789 births
1856 deaths
Scottish inventors
Bourbon whiskey
Scottish chemists
19th-century Scottish medical doctors
Alumni of the University of Edinburgh
People from Inverness